Bob Suter (9 June 1928 – 17 September 2016) was an Australian rules footballer in the Victorian Football League (VFL). Suter was a back pocket in the losing Essendon team against Melbourne in the 1957 VFL Grand Final.

External links

Bob Suter's obituary

1928 births
2016 deaths
Essendon Football Club players
Australian rules footballers from Victoria (Australia)